Heroes is a compilation album by Australian group, Icehouse released in 2004 to coincide with Seven Network's TV broadcast of the Athens Olympic Games. The album is a re-release of the 1995 soundtrack album The Berlin Tapes with two tracks removed and a second mix of "Heroes" added.

Track listing
 "Heroes" (David Bowie) – 4:29
 "Loving the Alien" (David Bowie) – 5:34
 "Sister Europe" (The Psychedelic Furs) – 3:59
 "Heaven" (Talking Heads) – 4:27
 "Complicated Game" (XTC) – 5:27
 "Berlin" (Lou Reed) – 0:49
 "All the Way" (Frank Sinatra) – 3:16
 "All Tomorrow's Parties" (The Velvet Underground) – 4:35
 "Let There Be Love" (Simple Minds) – 4:33
 "A Really Good Time" (Roxy Music) – 3:23
 "Love Like Blood" (Killing Joke) – 5:47
 "Heroes" (The Athens Mix) (David Bowie)

Charts

References

Icehouse (band) albums
Compilation albums by Australian artists